Caernarfon Rugby Football Club is a rugby union team from the town of Caernarfon, Gwynedd, North Wales. They currently play in the Welsh Rugby Union Division One North League.

The club was formed in 1973, and the grounds are located at Y Morfa, Lon Parc, Caernarfon.

The club colours are maroon and yellow.

The club has a First, a Second XV and a Youth team (Under 19). There is an extensive junior section consisting of Under 16, Under 14, Under 13, Under 12, Under 11, Under 10, Under 9 and Under 8 teams.

Notable former players
  Cai Griffiths
  Morgan Williams
  Rhun Williams

Club honours
 2007–08 WRU Division Four North – Champions
 2010–11 WRU Division One North – Champions
 2011–12 WRU Division One North – Champions

References

Rugby clubs established in 1973
Welsh rugby union teams